Andreyevo is a rural locality (a settlement) and the administrative center of Andreyevskoye Rural Settlement, Sudogodsky District, Vladimir Oblast, Russia. The population was  3,798 as of 2010. There are 31 streets.

Geography 
Andreyevo is located 21 km east of Sudogda (the district's administrative centre) by road. Tyurmerovka is the nearest rural locality.

References 

Rural localities in Sudogodsky District